Morton & Hayes is a comedy television series, shown Wednesday nights at 8:30 on CBS. The series was centered on the "rediscovered" work of a fictitious comedy duo; each episode presented what was purported as a newly-discovered Morton & Hayes comedy short from the late 1930s or early 1940s.

Six episodes were shown from July 24 to August 28, 1991.  The series pilot, entitled Partners in Life, aired approximately a year earlier on August 31, 1990, featuring a somewhat modified premise and slightly different cast.

Format
Each 30-minute episode was presented in the style of a documentary, in which host Rob Reiner introduced another long-lost comedy film short starring Chick Morton (Kevin Pollak) and Eddie Hayes (Bob Amaral).  The films on the show were supposed to have been produced by (fictional) producer Max King in the late 1930s and early 1940s.

Each black-and-white Morton & Hayes short was played, not as a parody of old-time comedy, but a tribute to it. The films were made to look the way they would have if they'd been authentic, and the comedy was in the style of Abbott and Costello, with lean Morton in the "Abbott" role and plump Hayes as his "Costello."

After each film, Reiner would discuss some of the "behind the scenes" stories about the making of the films, or the actors involved in them.  Later episodes featured Reiner interviewing one or more of the actors from the picture (made-up to look decades older, of course). In the final two episodes, Reiner conducted an interview of the "now-elderly" Morton and Hayes, who were reunited on the show after years of estrangement.

The characters of Morton & Hayes
Reiner's interviews revealed much more of the history of Morton & Hayes.  Chick Morton was born Albert Mossberg, and Eddie Hayes' real name was Vincenzo Giacomelli.  They started in vaudeville sometime in the 1920s doing a magic and singing act ("The Great Vincenzo & Al"), eventually creating the Chick and Eddie personas for which they would gain fame.   They worked for producer Max King in the 1930s and 1940s, making over 100 short films and becoming well-known stars whose likenesses were merchandised on everything from coffee mugs to foot pads.   Off-screen, Eddie led a quiet life but Chick was a well-known ladies' man, and made headlines in 1943 when he was caught in a "compromising position" with one-time co-star Dorothy Dixon by both his wife (a costume designer) and his mistress (a trapeze artist) during a USO tour.

The duo made numerous films before their contract was terminated with King in 1948; their final film, "Sheeps", had been a financial and critical flop.  The team subsequently split up, against Chick's wishes, although they made reunion appearances. Their last appearance was in 1968 on an episode of The Glen Campbell Goodtime Hour. (In real life, this show did not debut until 1969.)

In the years after their break-up, Eddie left show business and became quite wealthy due to investments in real estate.  At the same time, Chick's showbiz career faltered (his last credit was an appearance in a 1970s episode of Hawaii Five-O) as he experienced a number of personal difficulties, including four paternity suits and time spent in jail for income tax evasion.  ("It was minimum security...we called it Club Fed.")  Despite not having talked in over ten years at the time of the Reiner interviews, Chick and Eddie still seem friendly with each other.

Guests
The show used a "rep company" approach to casting, often using the same actors in different roles from episode to episode. Seen frequently in various roles were Christopher Guest (3 episodes, plus the pilot), Raye Birk (2 episodes), and Hamilton Camp (2 episodes).   Maria Parkinson and Allison Janney played Chick and Eddie's wives in 2 episodes, though any continuity for their characters beyond the role of "wife" was deliberately ignored. Making one-time appearances in the series were Courteney Cox, Joe Flaherty, Penelope Ann Miller, Catherine O'Hara and Michael McKean. As well, Jennifer Jason Leigh, Wendie Jo Sperber and David L. Lander all appeared as guests in the pilot.

Pilot
A pilot for the series, then called Partners in Life, was shown on August 31, 1990.  In this pilot, Kevin Pollak (who would play Chick Morton in the actual series) played Eddie Hayes, while Joe Guzaldo played Chick Morton.  As in the series, Reiner introduced the show ... but here in the character of "Max King III", the grandson of the producer of the original Morton & Hayes films.  The faux-40s Morton & Hayes film shown in this pilot was in color, not black-and-white, and according to Reiner, the comedy duo was more of a "Hope–Crosby type team“ in this pilot than the Abbott & Costello, Laurel And Hardy, or Olsen & Johnson-like team of the subsequent series.

Episodes

See also
 This Is Spinal Tap, another "mockumentary" from many of the creative staff behind Morton & Hayes, including Rob Reiner, Christopher Guest and Michael McKean.
 Garth Marenghi's Darkplace, a British show with a similar show-within-a-show format.

References

External links
 
 Morton & Hayes at Television Obscurities

Black-and-white American television shows
CBS original programming
1990s American sitcoms
1991 American television series debuts
1991 American television series endings
Television duos
Television series by Warner Bros. Television Studios
Television series by Castle Rock Entertainment